Pachybrachis brevicornis is a species of case-bearing leaf beetle in the family Chrysomelidae.

References

Further reading

 

analis
Articles created by Qbugbot
Beetles described in 1915